Tarzan and the Madman is a novel by American writer Edgar Rice Burroughs, the twenty-third in his series of twenty-four books about the title character Tarzan. Written from January to February 1940, the story was never published in Burroughs' lifetime. It was first published in hardcover by Canaveral Press in June 1964, and in paperback by Ballantine Books in February 1965.

Plot summary
Tarzan tracks down a man who has been mistaken for him. The man is under the delusion that he is Tarzan, and he is living in a lost city inhabited by people descended from early Portuguese explorers. The plot devices of a lost city and a Tarzan "double" or impostor had been used by Burroughs in some previous Tarzan novels.

Notes

External links
 

1964 American novels
1964 fantasy novels
Tarzan novels by Edgar Rice Burroughs
Novels published posthumously